The Sears–Ferris House, at 311 W. Third St. in Carson City, Nevada, is a historic house built in 1863.  It was owned from 1868 to 1890 by George Washington Gale Ferris Sr., father of George Washington Gale Ferris Jr., future inventor of the Ferris wheel.  It has also been known as the G. W. G. Ferris House.

Originally built in about 1863 by Gregory A. Sears, a pioneer Carson City businessman, the house was added to the National Register of Historic Places for Carson City in 1979.

It includes Colonial Revival and Georgian Revival architecture. This house is square in size and its measure is roughly sixty by sixty feet. It is currently under private ownership and not open to the public.

History 
Along with his family, Mr. Ferris arrived in Nevada as a gentleman farmer in 1864. Besides cultivating normal crops, he planted quite a few diversified trees. Mr. Ferris brought in many Eastern ornamental plants like hickory, black walnut and chestnut to Carson City. Several of those trees are at the Nevada State Capitol grounds till date.

George Washington Gale Ferris, Jr., born in Galesburg, Illinois in 1859, was the most notable person related to this house, he was a little boy when his family shifted from their homestead in Carson Valley to the residence in Carson City. He went to military school for graduation in 1875.  Later in 1881, Ferris, Jr. completed his graduation in engineering from Rensselaer Polytechnic Institute. He became famous in 1893 for inventing the Ferris Wheel situated at the World's Columbian Exposition in Chicago.

George Washington Gale Ferris, Sr. along with his wife Martha shifted to Riverside, California in 1881. Ferris Sr. sold the residence including a part of the block to Mary Ferris Ardery, his daughter in 1890 at $3,000. Mary changed the style of the front porch to a classical look.

In the twentieth century, the residence was owned by different owners: in 1922 the house was owned by the Mahers, Thurman Cross bought the house in 1956, in 1968 Ferdinand Hirzy took the ownership and Mr and Mrs Charles Herron moved in the house in July 1968.

References

External links

Houses on the National Register of Historic Places in Nevada
Colonial Revival architecture in Nevada
Georgian Revival architecture in Nevada
Houses completed in 1863
National Register of Historic Places in Carson City, Nevada
Houses in Carson City, Nevada